The Second Jewish Revolt can refer to the following:
A phase of the Jewish–Roman wars
 the Kitos War 
 the Bar Kokhba revolt
The 587 BCE phase of the Jewish–Babylonian war